Burak Altiparmak (born 15 October 1990) is a German footballer who plays for Turkish club Manisa.

Career 
Altiparmak began playing football in his hometown Berlin, at BSV Hürtürkel, before joining the youth programs at SV Tasmania Berlin and later Hertha Zehlendorf. In 2009, he moved to VfL Wolfsburg, but played in the reserve side only and the left the club again in 2011, joining Berliner AK 07. He established himself in the first team at his new club and appeared in 60 of the 64 league matches the club played while he was there. He was also part of the team that upset Bundesliga side TSG 1899 Hoffenheim 4–0 in the first round of the 2012–13 DFB-Pokal.

In 2013 Altiparmak joined Turkish TFF First League side Osmanlıspor on a three-year contract, but was sent to third-tier side Polatlı Bugsaşspor in the winter break. After spending the preseason back with Osmanlıspor for 2015–16 Süper Lig season, he dissolved his contract on 28 August 2015 to join German third-tier side 1. FC Magdeburg. There Altiparmak would be reunited with manager Jens Härtel under whom he had played at Berliner AK. He made his debut for Magdeburg in a 1–0 loss against Stuttgarter Kickers on September 11, 2015.

References

External links 
 

1990 births
Footballers from Berlin
German people of Turkish descent
Living people
German footballers
Association football defenders
VfL Wolfsburg II players
Berliner AK 07 players
Ankaraspor footballers
1. FC Magdeburg players
Denizlispor footballers
Bursaspor footballers
Manisa FK footballers
Regionalliga players
TFF First League players
TFF Second League players
3. Liga players